B. V. Nayak is an Indian politician and member of Indian Parliament in 16th Lok Sabha. He represented the Raichur in Lok Sabha, the lower house of the Indian Parliament. He belongs to Indian National Congress political party.

Early life and background 
Nayak was born to Venkatesh Naik and Savetramma on 14 Nov. 1966 in Arkera village in Raichur District of Karnataka State. Nayak completed B.Com. from B.R.B. College of Commerce, Raichur and LL.B. from K.P.E.S. Law College in Dharwad.

Personal life 
Nayak married Lakshmi (alisas) Padmavathi on 24 Dec. 2000. The couple has four children which includes two sons and two daughters.

Political career 
In the 2014 Indian General Election, he narrowly defeated the Bhartiya Janata Party candidate, K. Shivanagouda Naik by 1,499 votes and became a member of the 16th Lok Sabha and represented Raichur (Lok Sabha constituency) in Lok Sabha.

Positions Held

References

Living people
India MPs 2014–2019
People from Mandya district
Lok Sabha members from Karnataka
People from Raichur district
Indian National Congress politicians from Karnataka
1966 births